Kandelous (also Romanized as Kandolūs, Kandelūs, Kandloos, and Kandlūs; also known as Gendulas) is a village in Zanus Rastaq Rural District, Kojur District, Nowshahr County, Mazandaran Province, Iran. At the 2006 census, its population was 115, in 45 families.

Kandelous (anthropological) museum

Kandelous Museum is located in Iran, Mazandaran province in kandelous village which is a district in Nowshahr county. It was established between 1360 and 1368 through the tremendous effort of Dr.Ali Asqar Jahangiri.

The exhibit in this museum belongs to before christ and Islam and Islamic era. The exhibits are classified into different sections. They include weaves, clothes, rural ornamentations, statues, traditional paintings, metal and wooden cutleries and crockeries and china belonging to before christ up to Qajar dynasty.

This museum was a host to more than 60000 tourists from Iran and countries around the world in 2011 which made it enjoy the privilege of popularity at national and international levels.

References

Top Entrepreneur of Kandelus Dr. Ali Asghar Jahangiri 
At the same time, he is building a Kandelos Agricultural Complex with the aim of being able to do the same for the deprived and remote areas of Kandelos. Registration for the Cultural and Charitable Institute was also one of the projects being undertaken at the same time as the Hexane and Kandelus Agricultural Complex.

Official Website Address: Jahangiri Foundation 
http://bonyadjahangiri.com

Populated places in Nowshahr County